Suvarna Sahakari Bank was an Indian private urban co-operative bank based in Pune, Maharashtra, India, which operated from its incorporation on 22 September 1969 till its dissolution on 20 May 2009.

History 
The bank was started by Dnyaneshwar Agashe on 22 September 1969. S. K. Wankhede inaugurated the opening of its first branch. It was started to cater to the banking needs, primarily of Pune's middle class Marathi population. The bank was classified as an urban cooperative bank. As of 1972, the bank was headquartered in Shaniwar Peth, Pune, with the Reserve Bank of India (RBI) approving the bank's ability to loan credit schemes for small-scale industries that same year. In 1976, the bank's schemes featured in B. R. Ambedkar's articles on family planning. From 1990, the bank had nine branches in Pune, two in Mumbai and one in Shreepur till the time of its dissolution in 2009. In 1998, the bank organized an inter-bank cricket tournament in honour of Panditrao Agashe. By 2002, the bank initiated online banking, and was reportedly worth Rs. 500 crore. By 2003, the bank had installed Sarvatra Technologies' proprietary point of sale terminal. In 2004, Ashutosh Agashe was elected the bank's chairman.

2008 scam allegations

Background 
In 2004, Dnyaneshwar Agashe, chairman of the Maharashtra Cricket Association (MCA) at the time, was denied his right to vote in the Board of Control for Cricket in India's (BCCI) Presidential Elections due to allegations of factionalism within the MCA. The denial to Agashe to exercise his franchise saw Sharad Pawar losing by one vote in the election for the post of the President of the BCCI. By 2006, the bank business started having financial troubles, with some sources alleging that the bank's failure was backlash for the controversial BCCI presidential elections. In September that same year, the cooperative bank was put under moratorium by the Reserve Bank of India. The board of directors for the bank was superseded soon after. The moratorium came into effect on 14 October 2006, with the media demanding that the RBI launch an investigation of the bank's auditors.

In 2007, following the order of moratorium, the State Department of Cooperation appointed Mukund Ghaisas as administrator at the bank. Many of the bank's depositors held demonstrations at Agashe's Aundh residence and threatened criminal actions against the Agashe family, after which a speedy merger was promised by Agashe. Initial non performing assets totaled Rs. 125 crore, 13% against the seven per cent maximum allowable under the RBI norms, despite reports from June 2007 claiming that the bank would resume regular operations by late 2007. After the non-performing assets of the bank grew to more than 43%, account holders and depositors held a day long token fast to protest against the misinformation provided in regards to the alleged duped loans.

In 2008, the RBI gave the bank permission to pay interest on deposits made from January to June 2008; Agashe mortgaged personal property worth Rs. 200 crore in lieu of the recovery of the deposits worth Rs. 725 crore. Hotel Ranjeet, a hotel owned by Agashe was auctioned off for the same reasons. Cosmos Bank planned to acquire the bank after it hit this roadblock with the RBI and the subsequent announcement of the proposed merger with Cosmos led to large-scale panic withdrawals by Suvarna customers.

Allegations and arrests 
On 22 November 2008, Agashe, along with 14 other board members (including his sons Mandar and Ashutosh Agashe), was taken into judicial custody; the bank business was charged with a Rs. 436.74 crore scam allegation. The arresting police stated that the accused along with six others allegedly misused their rights and sanctioned loans mostly to firms owned by themselves and then defaulted the loans, thereby duping the depositors. The arrests were made after a complaint was filed by Rajesh Jadhavar, a special auditor with the Cooperatives Department at the Maharashtra government. The case was registered as an economic crime.

The judicial magistrate remanded Agashe and the 14 other suspects to police custody, with provisions of medical assistance if required, citing the senior citizenship of a majority of the accused. The economics offenses wing of the crime branch conducted a raid of all the homes of the accused, including Agashe's Aundh home to recover Rs. 1.5 lakhs. The prosecution stated that upon discovery of the money, further interrogation of the accused was necessary and alleged that the accused had disbursed loans to people close to them by flouting RBI rules.

In return, Agashe's defense counsel claimed that Agashe and his family had sold off various properties for the repayment of the loan. The defense counsel also stated that the Agashe family had extended full cooperation with the police and submitted that the family would repay another Rs. 80 crore after the issue of Suvarna's merger was settled. The defense also raised the issue of foul play, when the first information reporting of the allegations was not produced before the court three days after registering the case and further contended that the loans had been sanctioned by the bank's disbursement committee, a committee Agashe was not a member of. The bail applications filed at the time for Agashe, his wife, and his sister were subsequently rejected.

While in custody, Agashe's health deteriorated and he was admitted to Sassoon Hospital on 22 December, suffering from severe diabetes and gangrene, for which he had previously been denied medical assistance. He later died of a heart attack from complications of diabetes at Sassoon Hospital on 2 January 2009. Agashe's son Ashutosh was subsequently released on bail that same month, with his son Mandar being released in March.

Aftermath 
Upon Agashe's death, the depositors of the bank approached Indian Overseas Bank for help after the bank's accumulated losses were estimated at over Rs. 350 crore. The bank was allowed to be acquired by Indian Overseas Bank in 2009, with the Reserve Bank of India approving the merger in April of that year. The merger went through on 20 May that year. The transition of operations resulted in Rs. 14 crore worth deposits being withdrawn.

The bank's case, and failure amidst a political scandal is widely cited today in the Indian banking sector.

References

Further reading 

Banks based in Maharashtra
Financial services companies based in Pune
Banks established in 1969
Banks disestablished in 2009
Privately held companies
Indian companies established in 1969
Indian companies disestablished in 2009
1969 establishments in Maharashtra